Tinospora smilacina is a woody vine in the Menispermaceae family. It was first described by George Bentham in 1861. 

The Walmajarri name for this plant is Wararrkaji.

References

Menispermaceae